There are two places named Sami in Greece:

 Sami, Kefalonia, a municipality and town in the island of Kefalonia
 Sami Bay
 Sami (ancient city), in Elis